Tolomato can refer to:

 Nuestra Señora de Guadalupe de Tolomato, also called Mission Tolomato, a Spanish Christian mission in Georgia, in Spanish Florida, in the colonial era.
 Tolomato Cemetery, a cemetery established in the Nuestra Señora de Guadalupe de Tolomato.
 Tolomato River, part of the Intracoastal Waterway in Florida.
 Guana Tolomato Matanzas National Estuarine Research Reserve